Scopula uberaria is a moth of the family Geometridae. It was described by Zerny in 1933. It is found on Cyprus and in the Near East.

References

Moths described in 1933
uberaria
Moths of the Middle East